Morten Bakke (born 16 December 1968) is a retired Norwegian football goalkeeper.

Club career
During his career, Bakke played for several clubs, most notably Molde and Vålerenga.

He scored from the penalty mark in a 1992 Norwegian Football Cup game against Stranda.

International career
He made his debut for Norway in a February 2000 friendly match against Sweden and was Norway's third-choice goalkeeper at Euro 2000. Bakke earned his second and last cap in a January 2001 friendly match against South Korea.

References

External links

1968 births
Living people
People from Sør-Aurdal
Association football goalkeepers
Norwegian footballers
Norway international footballers
UEFA Euro 2000 players
Molde FK players
Wimbledon F.C. players
Vålerenga Fotball players
Raufoss IL players
Hønefoss BK players
Kniksen Award winners
Expatriate footballers in England
Norwegian expatriate footballers
Norwegian expatriate sportspeople in England
Eliteserien players
Norwegian First Division players
Sportspeople from Innlandet